The Indonesian houndshark (Hemitriakis indroyonoi) is a species of houndshark in the genus Hemitriakis. It is a tropical houndshark, known from the eastern Indonesian islands of Bali and Lombok, in the Indian Ocean. It was described by William T. White, Leonard J.V. Compagno, and Dharmadi in 2009. Females give birth to live young, with no placenta or yolk sac, and can have between six and 11 pups in one litter. When born, the pups measure 28–30 cm long. At first maturity, the houndsharks measure 90 cm, and males can go on to reach a maximum length of 120 cm, while females can reach a maximum length of 115 cm.

References

Indonesian houndshark
Fish of Indonesia
Indonesian houndshark